Nolan Allen Jones (born May 7, 1998) is an American professional baseball infielder and outfielder for the Colorado Rockies of Major League Baseball (MLB). He made his MLB debut in 2022 with the Cleveland Guardians.

Amateur career
Jones attended Holy Ghost Preparatory School in Cornwells Heights, Bensalem, Pennsylvania. He played shortstop in high school. Jones hit a home run in his final high school at-bat.  He committed to the University of Virginia to play college baseball.

Professional career

Cleveland Indians/Guardians
Jones was considered a top prospect for the 2016 Major League Baseball draft.  The Cleveland Indians selected Jones in the second round of the draft. On July 1, Jones signed with the Indians for a $2.25 million signing bonus.

Jones struck out swinging on his first career at-bat for the Arizona League Indians. He finished his first professional season with a .257 batting average over 109 at bats. Jones spent 2017 with the Mahoning Valley Scrappers where he batted .317 with four home runs, 33 RBIs, and 18 doubles over 62 games. He began the 2018 season with the Lake County Captains before being promoted to the Lynchburg Hillcats, slashing a combined .283/.405/.466 with 19 home runs and 66 RBIs over 120 games between both teams.

Jones returned to Lynchburg to begin 2019 and was promoted to the Akron RubberDucks during the season. He was named to the 2019 All-Star Futures Game. Over 126 games between both teams, he slashed .272/.409/.442 with 15 home runs and 63 RBIs. He led the minor leagues in walks with 96. He was also selected to play in the Arizona Fall League for the Mesa Solar Sox following the season. However, he left the league early after aggravating a previous hand injury. He did not play a minor league game in 2020 due to the cancellation of the season. Cleveland selected Jones' contract on November 20, 2020. Jones spent the 2021 season with the Columbus Clippers with whom he slashed .238/.356/.431 with 13 home runs, 48 RBIs, and 25 doubles over 99 games.

The Guardians recalled Jones from the minor leagues on July 8, 2022. He made his major league debut that same day against the Kansas City Royals.

Colorado Rockies
On November 15, 2022, Jones was traded to the Colorado Rockies in exchange for Juan Brito.

Personal
His brother, Peyton Jones, played Division I ice hockey for four years at Penn State and was signed by the Colorado Eagles of the AHL. He is currently a goaltender for the Belfast Giants of the EIHL.

References

External links

1998 births
Living people
Sportspeople from Bucks County, Pennsylvania
People from Langhorne, Pennsylvania
Baseball players from Pennsylvania
Major League Baseball infielders
Major League Baseball outfielders
Cleveland Guardians players
Arizona League Indians players
Mahoning Valley Scrappers players
Lake County Captains players
Lynchburg Hillcats players
Akron RubberDucks players
Mesa Solar Sox players
Columbus Clippers players